Lusk Creek Canyon is the name of a  canyon located within the Lusk Creek Wilderness Area of the Shawnee National Forest in Pope County, Illinois.  The area is a large gorge formed by the erosion of Pennsylvanian sandstone around a large horseshoe bend in the creek.  It contains plants such as fan leafed clubmoss, cinnamon fern, royal fern as well as ten endangered or threatened plant species.  It was designated a National Natural Landmark in 1980.

References

External links
National Natural Landmark: Lusk Creek Canyon
Shawnee National Forest

Landforms of Illinois
Landforms of Pope County, Illinois
National Natural Landmarks in Illinois
Canyons and gorges of the United States